The Birds of Australia is an illustrated book depicting Australian birds.  It comprises six parts (often bound as three volumes) of 303 full-page, folio-sized, chromolithographed illustrations of over 700 species of Australian birds, with accompanying descriptive text.  It was authored by Gracius Joseph Broinowski of Sydney, Australia and published in the early 1890s.

In 1987, 37 of Broinowski's illustrations were reproduced by the Broinowski Publishing Co of Perth, Western Australia in a limited edition of 850 numbered copies:
 Birds Of Australia. Gracius Joseph Broinowski. A Selection of his Finest Lithographs 1887-1891.

References

Notes

Sources

External links
 A scanned version of The Birds of Australia can be found in the Biodiversity Heritage Library 

1890 non-fiction books
Fine illustrated books
Books about Australian birds
Ornithological handbooks
1891 non-fiction books